The Congressional Western Caucus is a caucus within the United States House of Representatives composed of 62 members. Although it has historically been bipartisan, it is currently composed exclusively of Republicans. It was founded by then-representatives James V. Hansen (R-Utah), Bob Stump (R-Arizona), Joe Skeen (R-New Mexico) and Barbara Vucanovich (R-Nevada) in 1993 during the 103rd United States Congress. Despite its name, the Congressional Western Caucus has members from outside the Western United States, including as far east as Puerto Rico.

Members 

Last updated: August 23, 2022

Arizona
 Paul Gosar (AZ-04)
 Andy Biggs (AZ-05) (vice chair)
 David Schweikert (AZ-06)
 Debbie Lesko (AZ-08)

Arkansas
 Rick Crawford (AR-01)
 Steve Womack (AR-03)
 Bruce Westerman (AR-04) (vice chair)

California
 Doug LaMalfa (CA-01) (executive vice chair)
 Tom McClintock (CA-04)
 Jay Obernolte (CA-08)
 Kevin McCarthy (CA-23) (vice chair)
 Ken Calvert (CA-42)
 Darrell Issa (CA-50)

Colorado
 Lauren Boebert (CO-03) (vice chair)
 Ken Buck (CO-04)
 Doug Lamborn (CO-05) (vice chair)

Georgia
 Buddy Carter (GA-01)

Idaho
 Russ Fulcher (ID-01)
 Mike Simpson (ID-02)

Illinois
 Mike Bost (IL-12)

Indiana
 Jim Banks (IN-03)
 Jim Baird (IN-04)

Iowa
 Mariannette Miller-Meeks (IA-02)

Kansas
 Tracey Mann (KS-01)
 Ron Estes (KS-04)

Kentucky
 James Comer (KY-01)

Louisiana
 Steve Scalise (LA-01)
 Mike Johnson (LA-04)
 Garret Graves (LA-06) (vice chair)

Minnesota
 Tom Emmer (MN-06)
 Michelle Fischbach (MN-07)
 Pete Stauber (MN-08) (vice chair)

Missouri
 Jason Smith (MO-08)

Montana
 Matt Rosendale (MT-AL)

Nebraska
 Don Bacon (NE-02)
 Adrian Smith (NE-03)

Nevada
 Mark Amodei (NV-02) (vice chair)

New Mexico
 Yvette Herrell (NM-02)

North Dakota
 Kelly Armstrong (ND-AL)

Ohio
 Bill Johnson (OH-06)
 Bob Gibbs (OH-07) Retiring at end of 117th Congress.
 David Joyce (OH-14)

Oklahoma
 Kevin Hern (OK-01)
 Markwayne Mullin (OK-02) Retiring at end of 117th Congress.
 Frank Lucas (OK-03)

Oregon
 Cliff Bentz (OR-02)

Puerto Rico
 Jenniffer Gonzalez (PR-AL)

South Carolina
 Jeff Duncan (SC-03)
 Ralph Norman (SC-05)

South Dakota
 Dusty Johnson (SD-AL)

Texas
 Jodey Arrington (TX-19)
 Michael C. Burgess (TX-26)
 Brian Babin (TX-36)

Utah
 Rob Bishop (UT-01)
 Chris Stewart (UT-02) (vice chair)
 John Curtis (UT-03) (vice chair)
 Burgess Owens (UT-04)

Washington
 Jaime Herrera Beutler (WA-03) Lost renomination in 2022.
 Dan Newhouse (WA-04) (chair)
 Cathy McMorris Rodgers (WA-05)

Wisconsin
 Tom Tiffany (WI-07)

Wyoming
 Liz Cheney (WY-AL) (vice chair) Lost renomination in 2022.

References 

Caucuses of the United States Congress